These are the official results of the Men's 1,500 metres event at the 1982 European Championships in Athens, Greece, held at Olympic Stadium "Spiros Louis" on 9 and 11 September 1982.

Medalists

Results

Final
11 September

Heats
9 September

Heat 1

Heat 2

Heat 3

Participation
According to an unofficial count, 29 athletes from 20 countries participated in the event.

 (1)
 (1)
 (2)
 (1)
 (2)
 (1)
 (1)
 (2)
 (2)
 (1)
 (1)
 (1)
 (3)
 (2)
 (1)
 (2)
 (1)
 (1)
 (1)
 (2)

See also
 1978 Men's European Championships 1,500 metres (Prague)
 1980 Men's Olympic 1,500 metres (Moscow)
 1983 Men's World Championships 1,500 metres (Helsinki)
 1984 Men's Olympic 1,500 metres (Los Angeles)
 1986 Men's European Championships 1,500 metres (Stuttgart)
 1987 Men's World Championships 1,500 metres (Rome)

References

 Results

1500 metres
1500 metres at the European Athletics Championships